Meralco Theater is a theater located at the compound of Meralco, Ortigas Avenue in Pasig, Philippines. It used to be known as the Meralco Auditorium.

It seats over 1,000 people and is a popular venue for various concerts, plays, musicals and events.

History 
The Meralco Theater was inaugurated on March 22, 1969. It was designed by Filipino architect José María Zaragoza and forms part of the larger Meralco Building, which was completed a little earlier. The 14-story building, theater and adjoining buildings form a landmark in the Ortigas Center CBD.

The theater was where the staged graduation ceremony of politician Imee Marcos took place, according to University of the Philippines Cebu history professor Madrileña de la Cerna.

Current tenants
Sunday Mass Service (1974–present)
Palm Sunday Family Recollection (Every Palm Sunday of each year) (1985–present)

Recent events
HELLO KITTY LIVE Christmas 2016/17
ABS-CBN Christmas Specials (2006-2007)
Akapela Open (2015)
Apolinario Mabini Hiking Society The Farewell Concert (1974)
Awit Awards (1996)
Boombaga (1985)
Credo: Himig Tomasino 2013 (Annual intercollegiate choral competition of the University of Santo Tomas) 
Disney's Aladdin (2011 musical) (2012)
Disney's Beauty and the Beast (musical) (2005)
Disney's High School Musical on Stage! (2008)
Disney's Tarzan (musical) (2013)
Trumpets' The Little Mermaid (musical) (2011)
Eat Bulaga! Miss Millennial Philippines 2019 Grand Coronation Day (2019) 
Erik Santos Power Of One Valentines Concert (2010)
GMA @ 45: GMA 45th Anniversary TV Special (1995)
Guillermo Mendoza Memorial Scholarship Foundation Box-Office Entertainment Awards (2005)
Hi-5 House Hits Live! (2015)
Himig Handog Love Songs (2005)
Legally Blonde: the Musical (Off-Broadway Licensed Production) (2012)
Les Misérables (musical) (1993)
Libera (concert, February 19, 2019)
Jersey Boys 2016
Metro Manila Film Festival Awards Night Gabi Ng Parangal (2010, 2012-2013)
Metro Manila Popular Song Festival (1978-1986)
Metro Pop Song Festival (1999)
MYX Music Awards (2008-2009)
NU 107 Rock Awards (1996-2002)
PMPC Star Awards For Movies (1984-1988)
PMPC Star Awards For Music (2009-2010)
PMPC Star Awards For TV (1987-1990)
PATAS Awards (1973-1982)
Peter Pan The Musical - September 30 – October 30 (2013)
PhilPop Song Festival (2013-2015)
Shrek The Musical (2014)
Sueno: Himig Tomasino 2014 (Annual intercollegiate choral competition of the University of Santo Tomas)
West Side Story The Musical (2008)

References

Theaters and concert halls in Metro Manila
Buildings and structures in Pasig
Theatres completed in 1969